Heteranthelium is a genus of Asian plants in the grass family. The only known species is Heteranthelium piliferum, native to Central Asia, Afghanistan, Pakistan, Iran, Middle East, Turkey, and the Caucasus.

References

Pooideae
Monotypic Poaceae genera
Flora of temperate Asia